The Prevention of Damage by Pests Act 1949 is legislation in the United Kingdom, that creates a duty on local authorities to control mice and rats. The legislation grants powers to local authorities to compel land owners and/or occupiers to take action to keep land free from rats and mice.

References

http://www.legislation.gov.uk/ukpga/Geo6/12-13-14/55/section/4

Rodents and humans
United Kingdom Acts of Parliament 1949
Pest legislation